Devario yuensis is a freshwater fish endemic to the Lokchao River in India and Myanmar.

References

Freshwater fish of India
Taxa named by Laifrakpam Arun Kumar
Taxa named by Hijam Tombi Singh 
Fish described in 1998
Devario